Dale Robert Hunter (born July 31, 1960) is a Canadian former professional ice hockey player and the former head coach of the Washington Capitals of the National Hockey League and current co-owner, president, and two-time Memorial Cup-winning head coach of the London Knights of the Ontario Hockey League.  He was born in Petrolia, Ontario, but grew up in nearby (13 km) Oil Springs, Ontario. He is the middle of three Hunter brothers, with older brother Dave and younger brother Mark, to play in the NHL.

NHL career

Quebec Nordiques
He was selected 41st overall by the Quebec Nordiques in the 1979 NHL Entry Draft. He would begin his NHL career a year later in 1980 and played seven years with the Nordiques. 

According to his former Quebec Nordiques coach Michel Bergeron, even though Hunter was nicknamed the "Nuisance" on ice (La Petite Peste in French), he was known to be "humble" in the dressing room and a sort of "gentleman", close to all the players. He was the "perfect player", always the first to arrive at practice and ready to do all his best for the team. Thanks to his charisma, Hunter was a fan favourite in both Quebec and Washington. His leaving Quebec was seen as an obvious "mistake" linked to the team's future decline.

Washington Capitals
Hunter played for 12 seasons with the Washington Capitals, serving as team captain from 1994 to 1999.

In the 1988 Patrick Division Semifinals between the Capitals and Philadelphia Flyers, Hunter scored one of the biggest goal in Caps history. That goal was scored on a breakaway at 5:57, beating Ron Hextall and gave Washington the 5–4 win.

During the 1991–92 Washington Capitals season, younger brother Mark briefly joined Hunter with the Capitals, playing seven games with the club.

In the 1993 Patrick Division Semifinals between the Capitals and New York Islanders, Hunter led his team with seven postseason goals. That performance was marred by an illegal and potentially career-ending check on Islanders' star Pierre Turgeon. This illegal check occurred after Turgeon had stolen an errant pass of Hunter's and subsequently scored. As Turgeon was celebrating, Hunter came up from behind and checked the unaware Turgeon into the boards, leading to a concussion and a separated right shoulder. As a result of the incident, Hunter was suspended for the first 21 games of the 1993–94 season as part of new commissioner Gary Bettman's effort to crack down on violent play.

He played in the 1997 NHL All-Star Game.

Hunter holds the record for the player with the most penalty minutes to have scored 1,000 or more points.

In 1998, he led the fourth-seeded Capitals to their first appearance in the Stanley Cup Finals, defeating the Boston Bruins, Ottawa Senators, and Buffalo Sabres in the earlier rounds. In the finals, the Capitals were swept by the defending Cup champion Detroit Red Wings, with the first three games being decided by one goal.

Colorado Avalanche
Hunter finished the 1998–99 season with the Colorado Avalanche, the successor to the Nordiques. He helped the team reach that season's Western Conference finals, losing in seven games to the eventual Stanley Cup champion Dallas Stars. On that team, he often played on the same line as two other renowned pest role playersClaude Lemieux and Theoren Fleury.

Hunter retired at the end of that playoff run, after 19 full seasons in the NHL.

Post-NHL

Hunter's sweater number (#32) was retired by the Capitals on March 11, 2000. During the ceremony, the Capitals presented Hunter with one of the penalty boxes from the Capital Centre (the Capitals former home arena), symbolic of his exceptional amount of time served for penalties.

In 2000, Hunter and his brother, Mark—also a former NHL player—teamed up with Dale's former teammate on the Nordiques, Basil McRae, to buy the London Knights of the Ontario Hockey League. Dale became team president and head coach. He led the Knights to the 2005 and 2016 Memorial Cup. On January 1, 2006, the Hunter brothers were named to the 2006 Mayor's New Year's Honours List for Sports by the City of London, Ontario. Hunter's older brother Dave Hunter is also a former NHLer. His son Dylan Hunter is an assistant coach for the Knights and his other son Tucker also played for the London Knights before pursuing his education at the University of Western Ontario.

On November 28, 2011, Hunter resigned his position as head coach of the Knights to take the same position with the Washington Capitals, succeeding Bruce Boudreau. His brother Mark then took over as Knights coach. Hunter's defense oriented system caused some conflict with star Alexander Ovechkin but it helped the struggling Capitals make the playoffs, where they upset the defending Stanley Cup champions Boston Bruins in the first round before being eliminated by the New York Rangers, both postseason series going to seven games. On May 14, 2012, Hunter announced he was not returning to coach the Capitals in the 2012-2013 season, choosing instead to return to the London Knights.

On May 14, 2019, Hockey Canada named Hunter as the Head Coach for Canada’s National Junior Team at the 2020 IIHF World Junior Championship.  Hunter guided the team to the gold medal with a dramatic come-from-behind victory over Russia in the final game.

Accolades and controversy
With amassing a staggering 3565 penalty minutes, Hunter currently has the second-most penalty minutes in NHL history, after Dave "Tiger" Williams (although Hunter played 1,407 games to Williams' 962). He also holds the NHL record for most penalty minutes in the playoffs, at 731. The Capitals retired his No. 32 jersey. Hunter is the only NHL player ever to score over 1,000 points and rack up over 3,000 penalty minutes (1,020 points and 3,565 PIMs over 1,407 NHL games).

He scored in overtime for Quebec in Game 5 of their 1982 opening round best-of-five series vs. the Montreal Canadiens, and in 1988 scoring against Ron Hextall on a breakaway in overtime for Washington in Game 7 of their opening round best-of-7 series vs. the Philadelphia Flyers, making Hunter the first player in NHL history to score two overtime series-clinching goals in the playoffs.

In July 2006, Hunter was arrested and charged with DUI. The charges were dropped when the presiding judge ruled that his rights under the Canadian Charter of Rights and Freedoms were violated for unlawful detention and being denied his right to his lawyer.

In September 2005, Hunter was suspended by the Ontario Hockey League for four games after a player left the bench to initiate a fight in an exhibition game.

On January 20, 2006, Hunter was suspended for two games and his team was fined $5,000 for Hunter's off ice abuse of the officials. In May 2006, Hunter was fined $5,000 by the OHL for criticizing officials after the Knights were eliminated from the playoffs in four straight games. In September 2006, Hunter was suspended by the OHL for two games after forward Matt Davis left the bench to engage in a fight during a game; OHL rules state that there is an automatic suspension for both the player and the coach if a player leaves the bench to become involved in an altercation.

Pierre Turgeon incident
Late in the deciding Game 6 of the 1993 Patrick Division Semifinals between the Capitals and New York Islanders, Pierre Turgeon stole the puck from Hunter and scored, putting the game out of reach. Hunter, who was trailing Turgeon on the play, checked Turgeon from behind well after the goal as he started to celebrate. Turgeon sustained a separated shoulder from the hit, causing him to miss all but Game 7 against the Pittsburgh Penguins in the second round, as well as most of the series against the Montreal Canadiens in the conference finals.  New NHL Commissioner Gary Bettman, who had earlier promised to crack down on violence, suspended Hunter for the first 21 games of the 1993–94 season—at the time, the longest suspension in league history for an on-ice incident (in terms of games missed). Although at the time he claimed that he had not realized Turgeon had scored, years later Hunter finally admitted that he'd gone too far.

Career statistics
Bold italics indicates NHL record

Playing career

Coaching career

NHL

OHL

See also
List of NHL players with 1,000 points
List of NHL players with 1,000 games played
List of NHL players with 2,000 career penalty minutes

References

External links

1960 births
Living people
Canadian ice hockey centres
Colorado Avalanche players
Ice hockey people from Ontario
Kitchener Rangers players
London Knights coaches
National Hockey League All-Stars
National Hockey League players with retired numbers
People from Lambton County
Quebec Nordiques draft picks
Quebec Nordiques players
Sudbury Wolves players
Washington Capitals captains
Washington Capitals coaches
Washington Capitals players
Canadian ice hockey coaches